André do Avelar also known as "Andre dauellar" (1546 ca, Lisbon) was an author and professor who published astronomical works at the University of Coimbra. His works sought to explain astronomy, astrology, and the calendar year to the people of Lisbon. Despite his esteem he would later be sentenced to life in prison by the Inquisition as he was accused of being a Judaizer.

Personal life 
In 1546, André do Avelar, was born in Lisbon, Portugal. His mother, Violante Fernandes and father, Galás do Avelar were said to be New Christians that came from a poor background. They had seven other children, as Avelar had four brothers and three sisters.  

There is limited information predating the early life of Avelar including his work before arriving at the University of Coimbra. Although he was believed to receive education later in life at Salamanca and Valladolid obtaining a Master of Arts degree. It was noted he additionally studied theology during this time. Avelar became an official mathematics professor at the University of Coimbra in 1592 at 45 years old. It was here that he would continue to teach and publish works that outlined the composition of the universe until 1616. In his personal life he married Luiza de Faria and they had six children. He would become a widow in 1600 and become a Catholic priest despite retaining his Jewish beliefs through retirement.

Works

Reportório dos Tempos 
In 1585 Avelar published his first book, Reportorio dos tempos, which was a collection of works that pertained to astronomy, astrology, with respect to time itself. These works gave individuals access to knowledge of the universe and how it relates to the calendar year. Additionally, his work focused on the religious calendar and the actions one should pursue during a particular lunar phase. Some other authors who produced work in the same genre believed Avelar translated pre-existing books to create Reportorio dos tempos. Although he never references other authors he does make similar remarks and paraphrases certain chapters in his work. He would continue to publish an additional four editions of this title.

Sphaera trivsque tabella 
Sphaera vtrivsque tabella was published in 1593 and was noted for its similarity to another piece of work created by Johannes de Sacrobosco titled Sphaera. His commentary in this work was dictated as new as Avelar switched the order and presentation of his predecessor's book. The collection focused on the composition of earth and its surrounding counterparts in the universe such as the movements of the sun and terrestrial stars.

Proceedings of the Inquisition 
In his retirement, Avelar became a suspect of practicing Judaism. The Inquisition officially arrested him on March 20 of 1620 as he gave a full confession to following the beliefs of Judaism. Avelar stayed true to his beliefs as a Catholic but would ultimately remain detained and transferred to a prison in Lisbon in 1623. This controversy would also impact the lives of his children as they all were persecuted for their beliefs in accordance with their father. The Inquisition dealt with matters pertaining to religion or theology in which those who taught views opposite of the Catholic church were put to trial. These proceedings allowed investigations of entire households and sought to find the committance of heresy however necessary. This tactic was used with Avelar's family as he was pressured to admit guilt at the sake of his two daughters and son being detained by the Inquisition.

References 

Wikipedia Student Program
Writers from Lisbon
16th-century writers
16th-century educators